Linguistic Semantics: An introduction is a 1995 book by Sir John Lyons designed as an introductory text for the study of semantics within college-level linguistics.

Reception
The book was reviewed by Varol Akman and Edgar C. Polome.

References

External links
Linguistic Semantics: An introduction
1995 non-fiction books
Linguistics textbooks
Cambridge University Press books
Books in semantics